The Choegowi (literally Top Position) was a Go competition that ran from 1959 to 1997. The preliminary stages were 8-player knockout rounds, with the players who won the preliminary split into two sections. The winners of those sections played a best-of-three match to decide who would challenge the holder of the title. The final was played in a best-of-five format. The thinking time was 5 hours, and komi was 5.5 points.

Past winners

Go competitions in South Korea